Poland competed at the 2006 European Athletics Championships in Gothenburg, Sweden, from 7-13 August 2006. A delegation of 59 athletes were sent to represent the country.

Medals

References

European Athletics Championships
2006
Nations at the 2006 European Athletics Championships